The 1964 Arab Cup was the second edition of the Arab Cup hosted by Kuwait. In Iraq's first appearance, they won the title for the 1st time.

Participated teams 
The 5 participated teams are:

Venues

Squads

Final tournament

Tournament classification 
Iraq wins the tournament, Libya second.

Matches

Goalscorers 
4 goals
  Ahmed Ben Soueid

3 goals
  Hisham Atta

References

External links 
 1964 Kuwait (November 13–20) - rsssf.com
 Arab Cup 1964 - International Football

 
Arab Cup
International association football competitions hosted by Kuwait
Arab
Arab
November 1964 sports events in Asia